Dizzy Peyton is an American college baseball coach, head coach of the NCAA Division I Horizon League's Northern Kentucky Norse. He was an assistant coach at Northern Kentucky from 2005 to 2021. Prior to coaching, Peyton played 1 season of college baseball at Northern Kentucky in 2003.

Coaching career
On June 8, 2021, Northern Kentucky announced that long-time assistant coach Dizzy Peyton had been named head coach of the Northern Kentucky Norse baseball team upon the retirement of Todd Asalon.

Head coaching record

References

Living people
Northern Kentucky Norse baseball players
Northern Kentucky Norse baseball coaches
Year of birth missing (living people)